Graeme Brosnan is an Australian company director, investigator and writer.

Career
Graeme graduated from the National Institute of Dramatic Art (NIDA) where he majored in writing, directing and theatre production. He proudly boasts of having wasted more time and spent more of the best years of his life on this lost cause than any man alive (see below). In the 1980s Graeme worked as an Editor with the Australian Caption Centre where he was responsible for editorial control of their closed caption programs. He then embarked on a complete change of career and was hired to interview witnesses for a legal services company. Commissioned by law firms and major insurance companies to prepare and write reports on forensic investigations Graeme started his own company, Brosnans Investigation Services which was tremendously successful and he continues his involvement with the company to this day.

In 2003, Graeme co-founded the publishing company, This is My Story, which specialised in the production of Australian biographies.  It was later incorporated into AKA Publishing. in 2008.

While at NIDA Graeme studied under directors including George Ogilvie (Mad Max Beyond Thunderdome, Bodyline) and George Whalley (On Our Selection, Harp in the South) and worked on Whalley’s Jane Street Theatre production of Waiting for Godot which starred Mel Gibson and Geoffrey Rush. Graeme was Assistant Director on the Robin Lovejoy production of The Old Country which starred the larger-than-life Robert Morley, as well as George Ogilvie’s Sydney Theatre Company production No Names…No Pack Drill starring Noni Hazelhurst and Mel Gibson. He was the Artistic Director of the Jigsaw Theatre Company (Canberra) and the inaugural Director of the Central West Theatre Group. He has written several plays including The Quest, The Butterflies of Love, and Save Me. His play The Government Investigator had a season at the Q Theatre in Sydney and Conspiracy, a dramatisation of the longest running trial in Australian legal history, was produced at The Rocks Theatre, Sydney. Currently, he is hard at work on a new play, The Cannibals - when a famously reclusive writer discovers that his very private life is to be staged as a play, he hits back and unleashes a firestorm which threatens to tear apart his world.

Graeme has also written and co-authored a number of books including One One Five [The story of a 10-year legal dispute over a $115 invoice that went all the way to the High Court], Yellow Melody [The memoir of the mad, bad, crazy, beautiful misunderstood Danae Eadan who packed enough living into her 28 years to last a dozen lifetimes: the nineties teenager from hell, bombed out on ecstasy by the age of fourteen and an alcoholic at fifteen, the wild woman of the noughties, the pill-popping party girl trollied to the max who set up a cocaine business right under the noses of Carl Williams and the notorious Carlton crew who were too busy murdering each other to notice. Sex, rape, madness and suicide, in and out of nightclubs, psychiatric hospitals and jails while freebasing crack cocaine between bouts of bulimia and anorexia as she rocked on down the highway to hell. Yellow Melody is the compilation of memories and music of a young woman riddled with self-doubt, with one foot in the grave, of a girl who is so irrational and absurdly funny.] and An Awesome Ride [the tragic and inspiring story of Shaun Miller who had two heart transplants before the age of sixteen and whose last wish before he died was to tell his story.]

Written works

Books
An Awesome Ride (2012), by Shaun Miller, Ghostwiter
 One One Five (2011), co-author with Alan Manly.
 Yellow Melody (2010) Author
 Lolli's Apple (2010) by Tomas Fleischmann, Editor

Plays
 The Government Investigator
 Conspiracy
 The Quest
 The Butterflies of Love
 Mad Rooters

Awards
 Lolli's Apple by Tomas M Fleischmann won the Independent Publishers of America Gold Medal for Multicultural Non-Fiction Juvenile-Teenager-Young Adult category in 2011.
 AKA Publishing  has won three Galley Club of Sydney  Awards for Excellence in Publishing in 2004, 2005 and 2010.

References

External links 
  AKA Publishing 
  Independent Publishers of America
  Lolli's Apple 
  Yellow Melody

Living people
Australian writers
Year of birth missing (living people)